Frederick Ira Ordway III was an American space scientist and author of visionary books on spaceflight.

Ordway was educated at Harvard University and completed several years of graduate study at the University of Paris and other universities in Europe. He owned a large collection of original paintings depicting astronautical themes. He was a member of many leading professional societies and was the author, co-author, or editor of more than thirty books and over three hundred articles.

As scientific consultant, he was part of the production team of 2001: A Space Odyssey.

At the time of his death, he was the longest-serving member of the American Rocket Society that he joined in 1939. Ordway served as a member of the faculty at The University of Alabama in Huntsville (UAH) from 1970 to 1973, and he was awarded an honorary doctorate by UAH in 1992.

Publications

References and notes

External links

1927 births
2014 deaths
American expatriates in France
Harvard University alumni
Members of the American Rocket Society
University of Alabama in Huntsville faculty
University of Paris alumni
Writers from Huntsville, Alabama